Tekno Autosports was an Australian motor racing team, established in the 1990s initially for the motor racing activities of Stephen Webb, and later his son Jonathon Webb. The team competes in the Supercars Championship using two Holden ZB Commodores built by Triple Eight Race Engineering. Fabian Coulthard and Garry Jacobson are the team's current drivers. At the end of 2021, the Supercars team was sold to Peter Xiberras and rebranded PremiAir Racing.

In 2016, the team won both the Bathurst 12 Hour and Bathurst 1000.

History
Formed originally as a Porsche team running in the Australian Porsche Cup by Steve Webb, having previously raced Kaditchas in the Australian Sports Car Championship and Ralts in the Australian Drivers' Championship. Webb raced Porsches with modest success for several seasons, moving into the Australian Nations Cup Championship, a GT based racing series, in 2000. Gradually as the 2000s progressed the team's emphasis shifted from Steve to Jonathon as he emerged through the ranks of Australian motor racers. Jonathon Webb joined the Australian Carrera Cup Championship when it was formed in 2003 and finished third in his best ever season in 2005.

V8 Supercar Development Series 
For 2007, Tekno moved into the second-tier Fujitsu V8 Supercar Series and operated a Ford BA Falcon in the series with the assistance of Stone Brothers Racing. Under the racing number of #94, Webb placed fourth for the season. This relationship continued into 2008, with Webb placing third. In 2009, Tekno wound down as an operational racing team with Webb moving to the MW Motorsport team.

Supercars Championship
In 2010 Tekno entered what was then known as the V8 Supercar Championship Series with a Racing Entitlement Contract (REC) purchased from Tasman Motorsport. It linked up with veteran Queensland Ford racing team, Dick Johnson Racing with Webb racing a former Craig Lowndes Triple Eight Race Engineering Ford FG Falcon as #19. Mid-season, the team attained a title sponsor, Mother Energy Drinks. David Russell joined the team for the endurance events, the Phillip Island 500 and Bathurst 1000. Sebastian Bourdais joined the team for the Gold Coast 600. At the final event of the year, the 2010 Sydney Telstra 500, the team recorded their first win, with Webb winning the rain-affected Saturday race.

Tekno severed their relationship with Dick Johnson Racing in 2011 and became an independent single car team, still utilising the #19. The team maintained the sponsorship links with Mother Energy Drinks and had their engines built by InnoV8 Race Engines. Richard Lyons was the endurance co-driver for Phillip Island and Bathurst, with Gil de Ferran joining Webb for the Gold Coast 600.

The 2012 season saw the team expand to two cars which included a move to Holden and becoming a Triple Eight Race Engineering customer. Webb continued to drive the #19 car, with Michael Patrizi recruited to drive the #91 Commodore with a REC leased from Paul Morris Motorsport. Scott McLaughlin and Jonny Reid were the endurance drivers for Sandown and Bathurst, with Marc Lieb and Lucas di Grassi joining Webb and Patrizi respectively on the Gold Coast. Webb finished the 2012 season in 12th Position, with Patrizi in 18th despite competing without a full-time title sponsor all year.

Michael Patrizi was replaced in 2013 with Shane van Gisbergen, in a controversial move after van Gisbergen was granted a release from his Stone Brothers Racing contract on the basis he wanted time away from the sport. Both entries acquired new sponsors, with Darrell Lea sponsoring Webb's car #19 and VIP Petfoods van Gisbergen's #97 entry. Van Gisbergen quickly established himself a race winning threat in the team's new Triple Eight constructed Holden VF Commodore taking victory at Race 2 at the 2013 Clipsal 500 and Sydney 500. Webb also won the Skycity Triple Crown event despite not winning a race over the weekend. For the newly introduced Enduro Cup, Marc Lieb returned to join Webb, with Jeroen Bleekemolen joining van Gisbergen.

For 2014, the team returned to a single car operation with the leased REC returned to Paul Morris Motorsport and van Gisbergen driving the single entry to finish second in the championship. Webb joined van Gisbergen in the Enduro Cup, and after starting from pole, the pair were leading the 2014 Bathurst 1000 in the closing stages before a starter motor failed, leaving the car stuck in the pits for several minutes. In both 2014 and 2015, van Gisbergen and Webb won one race of the Gold Coast 600. Van Gisbergen finished fourth in the 2015 championship, only adding another race win at the Sydney 500 to his Gold Coast victory.

In 2016, Will Davison replaced van Gisbergen. The move brought near-immediate success, with the team winning the second round of the year, the Tasmania SuperSprint. After a lean patch in the middle of the year, Davison, partnered with Webb, returned to form at the Enduro Cup. After finishing third at Sandown, at the Bathurst 1000, Davison achieved an even better result, capitalising on late drama between the race leaders to take his second Bathurst crown, despite not leading any laps, only one tenth of a second ahead of van Gisbergen.

In 2020, the team will return to a two-car operation and relocate to Western Sydney.

In January 2022 the team was sold to Peter Xiberras and rebranded PremiAir Racing.

In September 2022 the company was placed in to voluntarily liquidation with tax debts to the Australian Tax Office in excess of $390,000.

Endurance/GT racing
Tekno Autosports campaigned two McLaren 650S GT3 cars in the 2016 Liqui Moly Bathurst 12 Hour. Shane van Gisbergen, Jonathon Webb and Álvaro Parente won the race, with the sister car of Will Davison, Robert Bell and Andrew Watson finishing 9th. With a third car this relationship continued into the 2016 Australian GT Championship.

Results

Supercars Results

Car No. 19 results

Car No. 22 results

Bathurst 1000 results

Supercars Championship drivers
The following is a list of drivers who have driven for the team in the Supercars Championship, in order of their first appearance. Drivers who only drove for the team on a part-time basis are listed in italics.

 Jonathon Webb (2010–21)
 David Russell (2010)
 Sébastien Bourdais (2010)
 Richard Lyons (2011)
 Gil de Ferran (2011)
 Michael Patrizi (2012)
 Scott McLaughlin (2012)
 Jonny Reid (2012)
 Marc Lieb (2012–13)
 Lucas di Grassi (2012)
 Shane van Gisbergen (2013–15)
 Jeroen Bleekemolen (2013)
 Will Davison (2016–17)
 Jack Le Brocq (2018–19)
 James Courtney (2020)
 Chris Pither (2020)
 Alex Davison (2020)
 Steve Owen (2020)
 Fabian Coulthard (2021)
 Garry Jacobson (2021)
 Dylan O'Keeffe (2021)

Gallery

References

Australian auto racing teams
Sports organizations established in the 1990s
Supercars Championship teams
1990s establishments in Australia
2021 disestablishments in Australia
Auto racing teams disestablished in 2021